The 1966 Ballon d'Or, given to the best football player in Europe as judged by a panel of sports journalists from UEFA member countries, was awarded to Bobby Charlton, who finished a single point ahead of Eusébio.

Rankings

Source: France Football

External links
 France Football Official Ballon d'Or page

1966
1966–67 in European football